The list of The Graduate School of Political Management people includes notable graduates, professors, and administrators affiliated with The Graduate School of Political Management of the George Washington University, located in Washington, D.C.

Alumni

Business 
 Matt Rhoades ('99) - Founder and CEO of America Rising

Politics 
Juan Guaidó - Interim President of Venezuela
Karen Makishima ('01) -  Representative of the Kanagawa 17th District, House of Representatives, National Diet of Japan
Stephanie Schriock ('97) - President of EMILY's List, Campaign Manager Al Franken for Senate, Campaign Manager Jon Tester for Senate

Faculty

Current faculty

Administration 
Lara Brown - Director of the Graduate School of Political Management
Mary Landrieu - Three-term United States Senator and current Senior Policy Advisor at Van Ness Feldman

Faculty 

Louis Caldera - American politician former Director of the White House Military Office, United States Secretary of the Army and California State Assemblyman
Peter Fenn - Political strategist, consultant, television commentator and owner of Fenn Communications Group, a political and public affairs media firm based in Washington
Mike Fernandez - American business executive and communications officer
Martin Frost - American politician and former Congressman, member of the House Democratic Leadership, Chair of the Democratic Congressional Campaign Committee, and Chair of the House Democratic Caucus
Dan Maffei - American politician, professor and United States Representative for New York's 24th congressional district from 2013 to 2015
Brian Pomper - American lawyer and head of Law and policy practice at Akin Gump Strauss Hauer & Feld
Christopher Shank - American politician and Executive Director of the Maryland Governor's Office of Crime Control and Prevention since 2015
Terry Sullivan - American political consultant and strategist
Cheryl W. Thompson - American reporter and investigative journalist
Evan Tracey - American Media and Public Affairs Executive
Ehsan Zaffar - American civil rights advocate, educator, policymaker and the founder of the Los Angeles Mobile Legal Aid Clinic (LAMLAC)

Fellows 
Eric Cantor - Former member of the House Republican leadership team, House Majority Leader and current Vice Chair and Managing Director at Moelis & Company
Bob Carr - Member of the U.S. House of Representatives from 1975-1981 and 1983-1995
Albert Wynn - U.S. Representative for Maryland's 4th District from 1993 to 2008 and current senior director at the international law firm Greenberg Traurig’s Washington, DC office

Former fellows 
Former fellows of GSPM include:

 Maria Cardona - Principal at Dewey Square Group
 Kent Conrad - Former U.S. Senator
 Arancha Gonzalez - Executive Director of the International Trade Centre
 Barry Jackson - Former Chief of Staff to House Speaker John Boehner, Strategic Advisor Brownstein Hyatt Farber Schreck
 Joe Klein - Columnist, Time Magazine
 Matt Rhoades - Founder of Definers Public Affairs
 John Shimkus - Member of U.S. House of Representatives for Illinois' 15th Congressional District
 Amy Walter - National Editor, Cook Political Report

References 

George Washington University
The Graduate School of Political Management